Tim Sanders may refer to:

 Tim Sanders (writer) (born 1961), American author, public speaker, and former Yahoo! executive
 Tim Sanders (footballer) (born 1986), Dutch footballer
 Tim Sanders (politician) (born 1982), American politician in the Minnesota House of Representatives
 Tim Sanders (filmmaker), New Zealand filmmaker